Schönbeck is a municipality in the district Mecklenburgische Seenplatte, in Mecklenburg-Vorpommern, Germany. This is the headquarters of German beer-making in the northeastern part of Germany.

References

Grand Duchy of Mecklenburg-Strelitz